Security, Territory, Population is part of a lecture series given by French philosopher Michel Foucault at the Collège de France between 1977 and 1978 and published posthumously based on audio recordings. In it, Foucault examines the notion of biopolitics as a new technology of power over populations that is distinct from punitive disciplinary systems, by tracing the history of governmentality, from the first centuries of the Christian era to the emergence of the modern nation state. These lectures illustrate a radical turning point in Foucault's work in which a shift to the problematic nature of the government of the self and others occurred.

Territory 
Foucault tries to trace the 'government of things' in relation to modern society, starting with Niccolò Machiavelli's The Prince and its reception. The anti-Machiavellian literature wanted to replace the ability of the prince to hold on to his principality with something entirely new: an art of government. Foucault then notices that this art of government was internal to society itself, not external, and that this type of self-government was practiced throughout the whole European society, such as in Italy, Germany, France, etc. which was seized upon by the modern nation state from which it took up as its central practices. This started as early as the 16th century which in turn enabled the elimination of the sovereign prince as a transcendental, singularity figure of Machiavelli's prince.

All of society was enmeshed within this process including the prince (ruler) himself, thus a century later government became political and collaborative with economy (modern political science as its 'rational' spokesman) and its partnership with political economy. Foucault further notices that political economy had a new tool called statistics founded by the Physiocrats economists (another term for scientific government) and it is with François Quesnay that this process can be found the very notion of economic government. So, according to a text quoted by Foucault written by Guillaume de La Perrière "government is the right disposition of things arranged so as to lead a suitable end."

Political means the institutions that are governing the rest of society; government covered by legal institutions which gives both the political electorate, political executive and political legitimacy, Foucault traces this practice to the ancient Greek text from the Pythagoreans known as nomas (meaning the law) according to which the shepherd is the lawmaker directing the flock, indicates the right direction and says how the sheep must mate to have good offspring. Foucault then reads into Robert Castel's work The Psychiatric Order, according to which the techniques of governing the whole society were finally finalised during the 18th century. Which was public hygiene and a whole battery of other techniques were used concerning the education of children, assistance to the poor, and through the psychiatric order, the institution of workers tutelage was coordinated through psychiatric practices. These technologies of power, Foucault claims, were introduced into the 18th century emerging prison system which migrated into the modern surveillance society through the infamous system that Jeremy Bentham tried to introduce, the Panopticon, the modern internal and external surveillance system that modern society experiences as 'self watch' and 'self government'.

Accomplishing the unintended axiomatic affect of unaccountability, while the full focal point of a ruler is often presented unchallenged to the populace as a system of unimaginable alterations, self-perpetuation and self regularity (among those who inhabit the system), where clearly defined roles are defined and repeated right throughout the system(through norms). The system can readjust itself to whatever is thrown at it, for example a dangerous individual can be spotted and isolated at will. This was accomplished, according to Foucault, (rather paradoxically) from other institutions in order to analyse them from the point of view of other technologies to form new systematic institutions as new knowledge objects. Foucault traces this original practice to government practices of the Middle Ages, where the term government meant an entirely different definition from now: in 'enough wheat to govern Paris for two years', it refers to control of one's body, soul and behaviour, conduct, diet, the care given to an individual, which Foucault very often refers to as 'governmentality', self conduct or self-government; this tactic could be traced back to the early eastern civilizations (Mediterranean East, Egypt, Assyrian Empire, Babylonian etc. Foucault situates this type of pastoral power squarely onto the new founded Christian Church where an organized religion ruled an entire society politically for 1500 years and caused constant battles of supremacy over men and their souls.

The Church rapidly colonized this type of new power between 11th and 18th century and, peculiarly according to Foucault, laid claim to the daily government of men in their real lives on the grounds of their salvation. He then derives from this that all the wars of religion were fundamentally struggles over who would actually have the right to govern men, and to govern men in their daily lives and in details and materiality of their existence; they were struggles over who has this power, from whom it derives, how it is exercised, the margin of autonomy for each, the qualification of those who exercise it, the limits of their jurisdiction, what recourse is possible against them, and what control is exercised over each. The Protestant Reformation traversed this relationship of pastorate power and what resulted from the reformation, although an historical event, was a formidable reinforcement of the pastorate system of religious power (political power in modern societies).

The reorganization of religious power also encroached on the sovereigns (ruler) political power, and it wasn't a smooth transition as is often portrayed. It led to a succession of tumultuous upheavals and revolts over between the 11th and 18th century; Norman Conquest, English Civil War, The Anarchy, Hundred Years' War, Crusades, Peasants' Revolt, Crisis of the Late Middle Ages, popular revolt in late medieval Europe. Foucault refers to these revolts as revolts against conduct, the most radical of which were the Protestant reformation, and concludes that this political process can be traced to the general context of resistances, revolts and great insurrections of conduct (Peasants' Revolt of 1524-1526 for example).

Raison d'État (reason of State) 
The new economic and consequently political relations which the old feudal structures were unable to manage and lacked any effective framework, were outside the traditional institution's reach. Foucault notices that the pastorate communities took charge of a whole series of everyday questions and problems concerning material life, property, education of children: this led to a re-emergence of philosophy as the compass for everyday life, in relation to others, in relation to those in authority, to the sovereign, or the feudal lord, and in order to direct one's mind in the right direction, to its salvation, but also to the truth.

Philosophy took over on the (until then) religious function of how to conduct oneself. With the advent of the 16th century western society entered the age of forms of conducting, directing, and government. Foucault then considers the great upheavals of Medieval Europe as the translation of the shift from god to men, political institutions and the political order. This produced a series of conflicts among those who tried to define sovereignty as the art of government, and the principia naturae (reason of government) of the political philosophy doctrine, known as raison d'État (reason of state). By the end of the 16th century, Western society began to define itself as territorial and expansionary with means of security as its primary focus.

Foucault proposes that the philosophy of raison d'État found its way into Europe through the Peace of Westphalia (known as the Balance of power in modern thought); this can be found in the works of Italian political philosopher Giovanni Botero, where Botero concluded that the state is a firm domination over people and to keep hold of its preservation one was expected to have knowledge of the appropriate means for founding, preserving, and expanding such a domination.

Foucault's reading of Bogislaw Philipp von Chemnitz, writing under the pseudonym Hippolithus a Lapide, first starts to query the first uses of the doctrine of raison d'État at the Treaty of Westphalia. This takes place between 13th century and the 18th century, and from the 16th century the subject starts to take the form of a perpetual peace proposal, which primarily belonged to the church in the Middle Ages, taking the form of a 'balance of power'.

The solution to the problem of democracy was the incorporation of the populace within the machinery of the state that had to govern. Foucault then further shows that raison d'État was not concerned with legality (as we know the term) but with political necessity: if necessary, politics must become violent leading to a coup d'état; this means that it is obliged to sacrifice, to sever, cause harm, and it is led to be unjust and murderous. This produced a whole series of problematic solutions to this problem, of which the population became of primary concern, coup d'état politics isn't the practice as we know it today. Under the auspices of the Renaissance was not primarily concerned with legitimacy, but survival of the state.

Foucault then tries to show only when the problem of population and security starts taking effect amongst the different practices that the consideration of population becomes a worry. Foucault then notices a point of departure pointing out the idea of sedition and revolt starts to enter texts, but 'the people' proved elusive to define all around Europe, and never entered popular discussion, at first point of juncture was the privileged titled nobles appointed and rewarded through the honours system created by the monarch and sanctioned through the legal system of the day; the entire Nobility knight's, barons, dukes, earl's and their rivals began to become seen and known as 'the people'.

Population 

Foucault considers the breakthrough of "this governmental reasoning" of the population as a substantial event in Western history and society comparable to the scientific revolution of the 16th century. Where a substantial transfer of techniques and technologies were transferred from the sovereign individual (the monarch) to a new modified apparatus known as the nation state. This change took place in the 16th century and continued right through into the 19th century. Foucault then gives examples of this procedure through the system known as raison d'État, from this analytical view of the state by Claude Fleury, war, raising finance, justice; there must be an abundance of men (large scale phenomena of population).

It is not the absolute number of the population that counts, but its relationship with the set composition of forces: the size of the territory, natural resources, wealth, commercial activities and so on. From Fleury's point of view, according to Foucault, the more there are of men, the stronger the state and the prince will be. So, according to Fleury, it is not expanse of land (expansion of the territory) that contributes greatness of the state but fertility and the number of men. Foucault then introduces into his Ontogenetic and, Phylogenetic investigations the concept of 'police' (see also miasma theory of disease); not the police of the criminal justice system as we know it today, but as concept known at that time as urbanisation of the territory and administrative concern; which means making the kingdom, the entire territory into a large industrious town. Foucault then considers how Mercantilism played a big role in this new context of European balance of power; these are the mercantilist requirements: every country should try to have the largest possible population, second; the entire population be eligible for working and be able to be put to work, third; wages given to the population be as low as possible, fourth; the cost price of goods at the lowest price as possible. Police according to Foucault consists of a sovereign exercise of royal power over individuals who are therefore subjects.

The actual police is the direct governmentality of the sovereign who rules through raison d'État. What Foucault means by the governmentality of the sovereign is the mind of the police runs through all of the populations, collective consciousness therefore, reducing criminality not its complete elimination, for political and economic reasons (see Discipline and Punish), not through fear, but the knowledge of the police as a system with its own structural objective as laws, judicial, legislative operating as a microcosm of the societal body, which ultimately represents the sovereigns will. Initially, however, this was not the sole intention of the police as we know it where Foucault introduces the original founder of the system now known to us as the police, Nicolas Delamare (1639-1723) (Foucault doesn’t mention the real founder of the police Gabriel Nicolas de la Reynie).

Foucault concentrates on how the police became an integral feature and intermingled with population, tracing the system on its foundation on how this is arranged around the composition of forces which the whole Western system of the balance of power, raison d'État was organised and arranged around. This system consisted of an organised scientifically trained professional army, (as opposed to a private army organised around the service of the king) incorporated within this military system is Thanatopolitics (Political power used through the military system for the purposes of warfare by other means) for the purposes of the slaughtering of millions of people if necessary, on an industrial scale, a system of legitimacy, comprising the sovereign, not the sovereign as a singular ruler but as an organised superstructure institution(modern government) comprising societal state functions, Political sovereignty which guaranteed the sovereign's legitimacy, judiciary, legislator, Parliamentary system; political power, political executive, political elite, and a political communication system while not offered any considerable attention by some Social scientist and historians nevertheless, these techniques do indeed exist, where it is admitted as such by those actual professional technicians(one such technique used is known professionally as the Sabido method pioneered by Miguel Sabido derived from the field of entertainment-education) and the political arm of this technique simply known as Demagogue who are involved in the operation of these techniques of deception and persuasion and a whole group of professional manipulators are needed which is primarily aimed at the entire worldwide television audience and political community.

And finally, the final piece in the jigsaw puzzle; the western political system of consent of the governed. This system at least gives the rationale of why it was necessary to have on board a widely disparate atomized populace; and its use, through the not widely known and little understood function of the Royal Prerogative The origin of which can be traced back to the Middle Ages from where the western system of political power gets its central idea, from the point of view and simple justification of consent of the governed, legitimacy and political power. This legitimacy, which is exercised through the use of Parliamentary democracy(see also Greek government debt crisis, National unity government, European sovereign debt crisis), was essential to the western system of political power and modern government;"The will of the people shall be the basis of the authority of government","The people" identifies the entire body of the citizens of a jurisdiction invested with political power or gathered for political purposes'" or "Popular sovereignty or the sovereignty of the people is the political principle that the legitimacy of the state is created by the will or consent of its people, who are the source of all political power".

All of this Foucault calls the political technology of biopower. This had to have the entire population on board in terms of ‘the police’, which had an entirely different meaning from what we know it today by tracing the concept back through time from the 15th century and 16th century usage, previous thinkers meant the term as a community association governed by a public authority and political power with accountability to a public authority. By quoting Johann Heinrich Gottlob Justi “of laws and regulations that concern the interior of a state and which endeavors to strengthen and increase the power of this state and make good use of its forces".

What Foucault reveals is that the original police had a different function as we know it today; for example one of their primary function was to administer the state in the guise of statisticians, allocating resources, supervision of grain in times of crisis, ensuring circulation of goods and men, secure the development of the state's forces. This was so successful this then led to an extension of the franchising out in the form of recruitment of the then University system. This bought in the next generation of administrators for the new ‘nation state’ system. This bought in two types of police; administrators who formed the Polizeiwissenschaft; the science of police or the science of government of the state, the other type would become known as what we know and associate the term today criminal justice system, Law enforcement, Forensic science and the modern uniformed police Polizeistaat police state, translated into English as policing of the state.

Originally from Germany, this system spread right throughout Europe from the middle of the 17th century and most crucially, this Polizeiwissenschaft grow a substantial bibliography of this system ‘science of police’ by the 19th century. Foucault's research shows that some 4000 different pamphlets and articles had emerged from 1520-1850 under the titles of “science of police in the broad sense” and “science of the police in the strict sense”. This became known as Cameral science(the new modern Public administration). The future administrators for the future modern nation state system with many functions; such as bureaucrats, civil servants, Think tanks, public policy makers, economists all from the university system.

Obedience 

For Foucault obedience was a vital mechanism of salvation of the government, not in the form of blind loyalty, but in the form of political salvation of the state(see Oath of Allegiance for example). This led to political theorists of the day juxtaposing theories concerning state, government, body politics, and political power; these theorists dare not call these laws divine or God-made law, but instead refer to them as 'philosophical'. As in Gabriel Naudé, an agent of Richelieu's, where he refers to the salvation of the state "The coup d'état does not comply with natural, universal noble and philosophical, it complies with an artificial, particular, political justice concerning the necessity of the state". For Foucault, politics is not above this process which it cannot be afforded, therefore, is not something that has to fall within a remit of legality or a system of laws. Politics, according to Foucault's use of the term, is concerned with necessity, necessity of the state which puts to an end to all privileges in order to make itself obeyed by everyone. So you do not have government connected with legality, but raison d'État connected with necessity.

Foucault then touches briefly on the theatrical practice of raison d'État and its prevalence over legitimacy. Which would be rather ironical as this is the main problem of theatrical practice in politics, which was in reality the practice of raison d'État. The theatre where this is played out in the form of dramatization and a constant mode of manifestation of the state and the sovereign as the holder of state power. Thus, for Foucault analysis this contrasts differently with and in opposition to traditional ceremonies of royalty which from anointment to coronation up to the entry into towns or major cities or iconic, famous funerals of infamous monarchs, this marked the religious association of the sovereign, or at least the sovereign's alliance with the character and association with religious power and theology. This, Foucault notices was William Shakespeare's main intention where the political representation (modern representation of this is media visual representation of political power, political consultants, image makers (media consultants), and 'power politics' and its constant fixation with voting and leading political personalities) of the sovereign Henry V for example was a part of historical drama, although based on real people and events, but for all intents and purposes was political representation in the form of plots, intrigues, disgraces, preferences, exclusions, good guys and bad guys and political exiles, where the theatre represents the state itself.

Foucault now turns his attention to obedience and the population and why this was a problem among political theorists of the times. He then produces Francis Bacon's text "Of Seditions and Troubles". In this essay Bacon gives a complete description on the physics of sedition, sedition and the precautions to be taken against it, and of government of the 'people'. This became a worry for Bacon and other political theorists; the first signs of sedition were circulation of libels, pamphlets and discourse against the state and those who govern. Second, Bacon notices the reversal of values or evaluations which puts the existence at risk. Weakness in the chain of command. Foucault reads into Bacon the theory of revolt of the people and there are two categories of individuals within the state, the common people (very often referred in text as Peasants, the People, the Common people, the poor, or at times Vagabond vagrants) and the nobility, what differentiates the common people and the nobility is their unshared interest.

They do not have any common interest between the two groups in Bacon's view the common people are too slow to engage in revolt and sedition. But if the common people and the nobility ever unite and become one unit they represent a threat to the sovereign's rule. A slow people and a weak nobility (because of their small number) mean that sedition can be prevented and discontents stopped from contaminating each other. Bacon then views the process of the danger of sedition where you can either buy the nobility or you can execute them. The problem of the common people becomes a different matter, they are not easily bought. So Bacon himself offers a whole series of measures and reforms that should be implemented, reducing the rate of interest, avoiding excessively large estates, increased wages, promoting external trade increasing the value of raw materials through work, and assuring provisions of transport to foreign countries.

While the differences between Bacon and Machiavelli appear subtle, it was 250 years later that the political model of reforms changed, why? Foucault was not much interested into the notion of reform as 'cure', but what was behind the underlying mechanism that was driving the system of reform ensuring reforms become a permanent feature of 'failure'. Foucault begins to trace through this development through the political model of reform and one crucial development was the economy, a politics of economic calculation with Mercantilism and for Foucault this was not just a theory but was above all else a political practice. The invention of the political campaign which Foucault traces back through its original modern founder, Cardinal Richelieu, who according to Foucault actually invented the modern political campaign by means of lampoons and pamphlets and more importantly, invented those professional manipulators of opinion who were called at the time publicistes.

Thus, for Foucault raison d'État must always act on the collective consciousness of the population, not only to impose some true or false belief on them, as when, for example, sovereigns want to create belief in their own legitimacy or in illegitimacy of their rivals, but in such away that the collective opinion can be modified along with their behaviour as economic and political subjects. The main function of public opinion is to produce a politics of believable truth within raison d'État. The most obvious example of all this is that propaganda, in its political sense has a twofold objective: 1, The main function of public opinion is to produce an emergence, alliance between political propaganda and a belief system of politics of truth within collective consciousness, a version of political continuity within raison d’Etat, this practice of political reform, while ensuring that the essential features of the system remain intact, gets passed on to future generations ensuring failure. 2, The other main political purposes of propaganda is to make sure that the chaos of modern living becomes accepted as the norm therefore, rendering whole swathes of society useless (through cultural practices), in its objectives to do anything about it. You can do something about it, but only within the rules of a political tool, even within the confines of political buffoons who appear to have no hold or control of the system that they are in charge of.

This political tool is soiled and rigged against those who use it and cannot be used for practical change but its power comes from those who gives comfort to those who use it in the hope of a false belief of change can happen leaving the practicalities of the system as ‘real’ events. This, Foucault notices produced two consensus correlations namely; birth of economists, birth of the ‘’publicistes’’ known as economy and public opinion the two correlative elements of field of reality that is emerging as the direct correlate of government.

Salvation 
Mercantilism, according to Foucault, was the first rationalization of the exercise of power as a practice of government; it is the first time that a knowledge of the state can be employed as tactics for the state, namely statistics. Foucault begins to chart through this historical, political reasoning behind the doctrine raison d'État (reason of state). The time of the Middle Ages where the idea existed of an indefinite permanent character of political power and government. This perpetual discourse, the idea of progress in men's knowledge about themselves and towards others, however, one thing was internally missing from this analysis, namely the notion of population. Foucault traces the conceptual discourse of the populace back to the Middle Ages definition of the pastorate which to the Middle Ages mind meant salvation, obedience and truth. First of all the discourse of raison d'État and salvation; Foucault manages to trace conceptually the system of salvation through the 17th century usage of coup d'état politics. Foucault notices that entire treatise were devoted to the very notion of coup d'état, for example a text written in 1639 by Gabriel Naudé, entitled Considerations sur les coups d'etat and writing in 1631 Foucault sites Jean Sirmond Le Coup d’Estat de Louis XIII.

See also
Foucault's lectures at the Collège de France

References

External links
 Michel Foucault Audio Archive Home

Works by Michel Foucault
Biopolitics
Political philosophy
Political science